California's 31st State Assembly district is one of 80 California State Assembly districts. It is currently represented by Democrat Joaquin Arambula of Fresno.

District profile 
The district encompasses western Fresno County and is anchored by the city of Fresno. Located in the middle of the Central Valley, the district is heavily agricultural and Latino.

Fresno County – 50.3%
 Biola
 Bowles
 Calwa
 Cantua Creek
 Caruthers
 Coalinga
 Del Rey
 Easton
 Firebaugh
 Fowler
 Fresno – 41.0%
 Huron
 Kerman
 Kingsburg
 Mendota
 Monmouth
 Orange Cove
 Parlier
 Raisin City
 Reedley
 San Joaquin
 Sanger
 Selma
 Tranquillity

Election results from statewide races

List of Assembly Members
Due to redistricting, the 31st district has been moved around different parts of the state. The current iteration resulted from the 2011 redistricting by the California Citizens Redistricting Commission.

Election results 1992 - present

2020

2018

2016

2016 (special)

2014

2012

2010

2008

2006

2004

2002

2000

1998

1996

1994

1993 (special)

1992

See also 
 California State Assembly
 California State Assembly districts
 Districts in California

References

External links 
 District map from the California Citizens Redistricting Commission

31
Government of Fresno County, California
Coalinga, California
Fresno, California
San Joaquin Valley